Arenales de San Gregorio is a municipality in the province of Ciudad Real, Castile-La Mancha, Spain. It has a population of 703.

Economy is mostly based on agriculture, with cultivation of vine and olives.

Economy 
The village economy is mainly based on the primary sector. The cultivation of vineyards and olive cultivation are very importants. But the most important product of the village is the fabulous melon cultivation.

The village has also a cooperative, bars and a rural hotel.

References

Municipalities in the Province of Ciudad Real